Valerio Pinton (born 14 February 1978) is an Italian rower. He competed at the 2000 Summer Olympics and the 2004 Summer Olympics.

References

External links
 

1978 births
Living people
Italian male rowers
Olympic rowers of Italy
Rowers at the 2000 Summer Olympics
Rowers at the 2004 Summer Olympics
Sportspeople from Padua